Barawana (Baré) is an Arawakan language of Venezuela and Brazil, where it is nearly extinct. It was spoken by the Baré people. Aikhenvald (1999) reports "just a few old speakers left" of Baré proper, and that the Guinau variety was extinct. Kaufman (1994) considers Baré proper, Guinau, and Marawá (currently extinct) to be distinct languages; Aikhenvald, dialects of a single languages. (Marawá is not the same language as Marawán.)

Baré is a generic name for a number of Arawakan languages in the area, including Mandahuaca, Guarequena, Baniwa, and Piapoco. Barawana is the language given this name in Kaufman, Aikhenvald, and Ethnologue.  It is also known as Ibini (a typo for Ihini ~ Arihini?) and Mitua.

Phonology

Vowels 
Vowels can come in three forms; oral, nasal, and voiceless:

 Vowel sounds /a ã ḁ/, /e ẽ e̥/, and /u ũ u̥/ are heard as [ɵ ɵ̃ ɵ̥], [ɛ ɛ̃ ɛ̥], and [o õ o̥] when in unstressed position.
/a/ is heard as a back sound [ɑ] when after /w/.

Consonants 

 Sounds /t, n/ are realized as dentalized and palatal [t̪, ɲ] before and after /i/.
/d/ is realized as an affricate [d͡ʒ] before front vowels.
/ɾ/ can tend to fluctuate to a velarized [ɫ] in free variation.

References

Languages of Brazil
Arawakan languages
Extinct languages of South America